Cedar Lake is in Le Flore County, Oklahoma inside the Ouachita National Forest.

It is a different body of water from the privately owned Cedar Lake in Canadian County, Oklahoma.

Description
The elevation is 

Now owned by the U. S. Forest Service, the lake was constructed on Big Cedar Creek in 1937 by the Civilian Conservation Corps for erosion-control purposes. It is primarily used for recreation, and features fishing, boating, picnicking, hiking and camping activities. The lake is open year-round.

Fishing
The lake is regularly stocked with largemouth bass, catfish and bluegill. According to an Oklahoma Department of Wildlife Conservation (ODWC) official, it is known for its big bass potential.

Dale Miller set a state record when he caught a 14 pound 13.7 ounce largemouth bass, having a length of  26 inches and a girth of 23 inches. ODWC confirmed the record measurement, then released the fish back to the lake. The previous record was held by Benny Williams, Jr., who caught a 14 pound 12 ounce bass from the same lake on March 23, 2012.

See also
 Indian Nations National Wildlife and Scenic Area

References

LeFlore County, Oklahoma
Reservoirs in Oklahoma
Infrastructure completed in 1937